The Mark VI is a class of patrol boat in service with the United States Navy, designed to patrol riverine and littoral waters. The first two Mark VI boats were delivered to Coastal Riverine Group TWO in September 2015. Two boats were forward deployed to Bahrain in April 2016, with Coastal Riverine Squadron TWO being the first to operate the craft in the Persian Gulf while assigned under Task Force 56. The Mark VI replaced the less capable Riverine Command Boats previously assigned to Task Force 56.

Two craft were delivered to Coastal Riverine Group ONE in 2016 and were subsequently forward deployed to Guam in 2017. A third craft was deployed to Bahrain in 2018 to replace the Coastal Command Boat prototype craft, which was returned to the United States where it was deactivated and placed in long term storage. A third craft was deployed to Guam, rounding out the initial deployment of the craft. The forward deployed craft are manned by rotational crews from the Navy's Coastal Riverine Force.

The final craft were delivered to Coastal Riverine Group ONE in 2017, and Coastal Riverine Group TWO in 2018 to complete delivery of the 12 craft. There are currently no plans to field additional craft with the Navy though several partner nations have expressed interest in potentially purchasing a number of the craft via the foreign military sales process for their own use.

History
The Mark VI patrol boat is built by SAFE Boats International.  It represents a shift in Navy focus from Cold War-era blue water engagements to placing importance on brown water littoral zone operations. Designed to replace the legacy Riverine Command Boat for open water and near shore operations, the Mark VI is larger, more survivable, and better equipped with modernized weapons, communications, and intelligence, surveillance and reconnaissance systems. Despite the name the craft is not a replacement for the Mark V Special Operations Craft which was operated by Special Warfare Combatant Crewmen from 1998-2012 in a Special Operations role.

The craft can perform missions including patrolling shallow areas, search-and-seizure operations, escort high-value shipping and fleet units in foreign ports, and support special operations forces.  Safe Boats delivered the first of 12 Mark VI craft to the Navy in August 2014. Potential customers from the Middle East and Central and South America have also made inquiries about the vessel.

Coastal Riverine Group 2 took ownership of the first two of Mark VI patrol boats on 8 September 2015. Two were first deployed to the Persian Gulf to support U.S. 5th Fleet operations out of Bahrain in April 2016, with three total on station in the 5th Fleet as of 2018.

Despite initial plans to acquire 48 Mark VI boats, only 12 were ordered in 2015 and delivered by 2017 with none purchased afterwards. In early 2021, the U.S. Navy signaled its intention to divest them by the end of the year. The decision was made as a cost saving measure, as the boats were not extensively used, suffered from reliability problems, and were considered too expensive to maintain. The Navy however rescinded the plan in May 2021 pending budget decisions.

As part of American efforts to help rebuild Ukraine's naval capabilities after the Russian annexation of the Crimean Peninsula in 2014, the U.S. State Department approved a Foreign Military Sales case for the supply of up to 16 MK VI patrol boats and associated equipment to Ukraine in June 2020. 12 boats out of the 16 approved for sale has been ordered as of January 2022 and the Ukrainian President Volodymyr Zelensky has said that deliveries of the Mark VI patrol boats to Ukraine will begin in 2022.

Design
It has a crew of 10 sailors and can carry 8 additional personnel. The interior is spacious, with berthing for the crew and shock-absorbing seats for other occupants; the seats and sound deadening berthing spaces and galley allow the crew to operate in relatively high sea states while attenuating crew fatigue and risk of injury. The boats are fully networked with a command, control, communication and computing, surveillance and intelligence (C4SI) suite for enhanced situational awareness, survivability, and multi-mission support which includes flat screen monitors mounted throughout the ship. Payloads can be configured to fulfill missions ranging from mine hunting to defending against swarm boat attacks.

Standard armament consists of two remote-controlled Mk 38 Mod 2 25 mm chain guns and six crewed M2 .50 caliber machine guns.  Depending on mission needs, gun mounts can hold M240 machine guns, M134 miniguns, and Mk 19 grenade launchers.  The Mark VI is equipped with the MK50 Gun Weapon System (GWS), a shipboard version of the vehicle-mounted M153 CROWS remote turret that enables crewmen to use its camera and gun from the operator's station below deck. It is also planned to mount guided missiles such as the BGM-176B Griffin.  Advanced lightweight armor plating is installed around key elements such as the crew compartment, engines and fuel tanks.

The reconfigurable main aft cabin can hold payloads such as Navy SEAL operators or a medical facility. The rear deck and stern is able to launch and recover small boats, unmanned aerial vehicles (UAVs), and unmanned undersea vehicles (UUVs). The craft's mast lowers to decrease overall height, allowing the craft to enter amphibious ship well decks. Mark VI can be transported and deployed by Navy amphibious ships such as landing helicopter docks, amphibious transport docks, and landing ship docks. Each Mark VI cost $15 million to build.

Coastal Command Boat variant
The Coastal Command Boat (CCB) is a 'one-off' prototype of the Mk VI, delivered to the Navy in 2013 to aid in developing systems, procedures, and requirements for the Mark VI, which was under advanced development at that time. Its engine, armament, and other systems are otherwise identical to that of the Mark VI, though its smaller size gives it an endurance of over 24 hours at cruise speed.

It was deployed to the U.S. 5th Fleet in Bahrain in February 2014 to evaluate tactics and techniques for using the Mark VI in advance of the latter's planned deployment to Bahrain in 2016. It was assigned to Task Force 56 until it was returned to the United States for deactivation in 2018 following arrival of the third (and final) Mark VI craft in Bahrain. The Coastal Command Boat was not retained on active service due to its unique configuration as a developmental test craft, which posed challenges for logistical and parts support.

See also
Cyclone-class patrol ship

References

External links
 MK VI Patrol Boat - NAVSEA.Navy.mil

Equipment of the United States Navy
Military boats
Patrol vessels of the United States Navy
Patrol boat classes